Scott Anthony Schebler (born October 6, 1990) is an American professional baseball outfielder who is currently a free agent. Scott grew up in Shueyville, Iowa and attended Prairie High School in Cedar Rapids. He previously played in Major League Baseball (MLB) for the Los Angeles Dodgers, Cincinnati Reds, Atlanta Braves, and Los Angeles Angels.

Amateur career
Born and raised in Shueyville, Iowa, Schebler attended Cedar Rapids Prairie High School. Growing up, Schebler was a fan of the St. Louis Cardinals. At Cedar Rapids Prairie, Schebler was a five-sport athlete in baseball, football, basketball, soccer, and track & field. Schebler later attended Des Moines Area Community College in Boone, Iowa.

Professional career

Los Angeles Dodgers

Schebler was drafted by the Los Angeles Dodgers in the 26th round of the 2010 MLB Draft out of Des Moines Area Community College. He began his career with five games for the Arizona League Dodgers in 2010. In 2011 with the Ogden Raptors of the Pioneer Baseball League, he hit .285 in 70 games with 12 home runs and 58 RBI and in 2012 with the Great Lakes Loons of the Midwest League, he hit .312 with 6 homers and 67 RBI in 137 games.

Schebler had a breakthrough season in 2013 with the Rancho Cucamonga Quakes of the California League. In 125 games, he hit .296 with 27 home runs and 91 RBI to lead the entire Dodgers farm system in both homers and RBI. He was selected as a post-season California League All-Star and the Dodgers minor league player of the year.  He was promoted to the AA Chattanooga Lookouts for 2014 and was selected to the mid-season Southern League All-Star Game. He was also selected as a post-season All-Star as he hit .280 with 28 homers and 73 RBI in 135 games. After the season, he played with the Glendale Desert Dogs in the Arizona Fall League and was selected to the AFL Top Prospects List.

On November 20, 2014, Schebler was added to the Dodgers 40-man roster in order to protect him from the Rule 5 Draft and he was assigned to the AAA Oklahoma City Dodgers to start the 2015 season.

Schebler was called up to the majors by the Dodgers on June 5, 2015. He recorded his first big league hit on a single to left field on the first pitch he faced against Carlos Martínez of the St. Louis Cardinals. He was optioned back to the minors the next day. He completed the minor league season by hitting .241 in 121 games with 13 homers and 51 RBI for Oklahoma City and rejoined the Dodgers when rosters were expanded in September. He hit his first major league home run off of James Shields of the San Diego Padres on September 4, 2015. In 19 games, he hit .250 with three homers and four RBI.

Cincinnati Reds
On December 16, 2015, Schebler, along with José Peraza and Brandon Dixon, were traded to the Cincinnati Reds in a three team trade that sent Frankie Montas, Micah Johnson, and Trayce Thompson to the Dodgers and Todd Frazier to the Chicago White Sox.

Making his first opening day roster with Cincinnati, Schebler opened the 2016 season as the left-handed side of a timeshare in left field with Adam Duvall, but struggled offensively in the opening month. Schebler hit .188 in his first 69 plate appearances, while only making 13 starts in Cincinnati's 31 games. With Duvall having seized the left field job, Schebler was optioned to Triple-A Louisville on May 8 to gain more playing time.

On August 1, established Cincinnati outfielder Jay Bruce was traded to the Mets, and the first opportunity to replace him went to Schebler, who had hit well in Louisville. In 75 games with the Bats, Schebler hit .311 with 13 HR and 43 RBI, including a game where he hit for the cycle, while also winning the International League's Player of the Month honors for July. On August 2, Schebler was recalled to Cincinnati, and that night, he hit a 3-run walk off home run against the St. Louis Cardinals. Following his return to Cincinnati, in the team's final 58 games, Schebler made 51 starts, hitting .290 with 8 home runs and 32 RBI, and ended the 2016 season as the team's preliminary option in right field. He hit his first major league grand slam against Chris Flexen of the New York Mets.

He finished his first season with the Reds hitting .265 with 9 home runs and 40 RBI. In 2017, Schebler played the majority of the season with the Reds, hitting 30 home runs with 67 RBI's. Schebler struggled mightily in 2019, albeit in limited time in the majors as he hit .123 in 95 plate appearances. On July 19, 2020, Schebler was designated for assignment by the Reds.

Atlanta Braves
On July 24, 2020, Schebler was traded to the Atlanta Braves in exchange for cash considerations. Schebler was added to Atlanta’s active roster five days later. He was designated for assignment on August 6 after receiving only 1 at-bat for the team. He became a free agent on November 2, 2020.

Los Angeles Angels
On November 21, 2020, Schebler signed a minor league contract with the Los Angeles Angels organization. On April 16, 2021, Schebler was selected to the 40-man roster to take the roster spot of Jon Jay. On May 4, Schebler was designated for assignment after notching just four hits in 27 plate appearances. On May 8, Schebler was sent outright to the Salt Lake Bees. On June 28, Schebler's contract was selected by the Angels. Schebler went 1-for-7 in 3 games before he was designated for assignment again on July 3. He was again outrighted to Salt Lake on July 6. On October 6, 2021, Schebler elected free agency.

Colorado Rockies
On March 12, 2022, Schebler signed a minor league contract with the Colorado Rockies. He was released on July 4, 2022.

References

External links

1990 births
Living people
People from Boone, Iowa
Baseball players from Iowa
Major League Baseball outfielders
Los Angeles Dodgers players
Cincinnati Reds players
Atlanta Braves players
Los Angeles Angels players
Arizona League Dodgers players
Ogden Raptors players
Great Lakes Loons players
Rancho Cucamonga Quakes players
Chattanooga Lookouts players
Glendale Desert Dogs players
Oklahoma City Dodgers players
Louisville Bats players
Salt Lake Bees players